John Gideon Millingen (1782–1862) was a British army surgeon and author. He was the brother of James Millingen and an uncle of Julius Michael Millingen.

Born in Westminster to parents of Dutch descent, Millingen was educated in Paris where he achieved his medical degree.  He became an assistant surgeon in the British Army in 1802, serving in the Peninsular War and won a medal at Waterloo and the surrender of Paris.  He retired in 1823 and was appointed as a physician to the military asylum at Chatham and Hanwell.

Works
The Bee-hive (1818), a musical farce
Ladies at Home, or Gentlemen, We Can Do Without You (1819)
Sketches of Ancient and Modern Boulogne (1826) (Prose)
Adventures of an Irish Gentleman, 3 vol. (1830)
The Illustrious Stranger, or Married and Buried (1827)
Who'll Lend Me a Wife? (1834)
The Miser's Daughter (1835)
Borrowed Feathers (1836)
Curiosities of Medical Experience (1837)
Stories of Torres Vedras, 3 vol. (1839) 
The History of Duelling (1841)
Recollections of Republican France from 1790 to 1801 (1848)

Further reading

References

External links
 
 

1782 births
1862 deaths
British Army regimental surgeons
People from Westminster
British Army personnel of the Napoleonic Wars
Recipients of the Waterloo Medal
British people of Dutch descent
English people of Dutch-Jewish descent